Snodin is a surname. Notable people with the surname include:

 Glynn Snodin (born 1960), English football player and manager
 Ian Snodin (born 1963), English football player, manager, and sports analyst
 Jeff Snodin (born 1965), English cyclist

See also
 Snowden (surname)